Polyrhachis hippomanes is a species of ant in the subfamily Formicinae, found in Sri Lanka. Three subspecies are recognized. 2 subspecies were given full species status recently.

Subspecies
Polyrhachis hippomanes boettcheri Stitz, 1925 – Borneo, Philippines
Polyrhachis hippomanes ceylonensis Emery, 1893 – India, Sri Lanka, China
Polyrhachis hippomanes hippomanes Smith, F., 1861 – Borneo, Sulawesi, India, Thailand
Polyrhachis hippomanes hortensis Forel, 1913 – Indonesia, New Guinea – Polyrhachis hortensis
Polyrhachis hippomanes lucidula Emery, 1893 – Cambodia, Myanmar, China – Polyrhachis lucidula

References

External links

 at antwiki.org
Animaldiversity.org
Itis.org

Formicinae
Hymenoptera of Asia
Insects described in 1861